The 1975 Nemzeti Bajnokság I is the 25th season of the Nemzeti Bajnokság I, Hungary's premier Handball league.

Final list 

* M: Matches W: Win D: Drawn L: Lost G+: Goals earned G-: Goals got P: Point

Sources 
A magyar sport évkönyve 1975
magyar bajnokságok - kezitortenelem.hu 

Nemzeti Bajnoksag
Nemzeti Bajnoksag 
Handball leagues in Hungary
1975 in women's handball
1975 in Hungarian women's sport